Utetheisa abraxoides is a moth in the family Erebidae. It was described by Francis Walker in 1862. It is found on Borneo. The habitat consists of upper montane forests.

References

Moths described in 1862
abraxoides